Temecla is a genus of Neotropical hairstreak butterfly in the family Lycaenidae.

Species
Temecla tema  (Hewitson, 1867)  Brazil (Amazon), Colombia. 
Temecla paron  (Godman & Salvin, [1887])  Guatemala. 
Temecla heraclides  (Godman & Salvin, [1887]) 
Temecla sergius  (Godman & Salvin, [1887]) Venezuela, Colombia. 
Temecla bennetti  (Dyar, 1913) Peru
Temecla peona  (Hewitson, 1874)

References

Eumaeini
Lycaenidae of South America
Lycaenidae genera